The  is a yakuza organization based in Osaka, Japan. The Azuma-gumi is a designated yakuza group with an estimated 90 active members.

History
The Azuma-gumi was registered as a designated yakuza group under the Organized Crime Countermeasures Law in August 1993.

Condition
The Azuma-gumi is one of the two designated yakuza groups based in the Osaka Prefecture, along with the Sakaume-gumi, and maintains its headquarters office in Nishinari, Osaka.

References

1960 establishments in Japan
Yakuza groups